Jefferson Community School is a non-profit independent school located in downtown Port Townsend, Washington. Opened in 2005, it is one of the only four independent educational institutions in Jefferson County. Jefferson Community School serves students from grades 6 to 12, and had a total enrollment of 16 students for the 2018–2019 school year.

Academics 
As of 2018, the school has fewer than 10 faculty members. In the 2018–2019 school year, the student–teacher ratio was 6 students per teacher. The dropout rate is 0% far lower than the state average.

Athletics 
The school is currently too small to have any organized athletic teams but the students may participate on any of the Port Townsend High School sports teams.

Expeditions 
Jefferson Community School practices "global learning" by traveling to such locations as Thailand, Japan, Mexico, California, Arizona , Costa Rica and New Orleans. During March 2017, JCS students traveled to Nepal hiking to 13,000 ft on the trail to Everest Base Camp. Other recent trips include 2015 Guatemala and Belize, 2015 Cuba, Vietnam and Cambodia, as well as Mexico, 2017 Cuba and Nepal, 2018 Costa Rica and Canada, 2019 Costa Rica, California and Arizona.

References

External links
Official website

Private high schools in Washington (state)
Education in Port Townsend, Washington
Buildings and structures in Clallam County, Washington
High schools in Clallam County, Washington
Private middle schools in Washington (state)